Bottineau County is a county in the U.S. state of North Dakota. As of the 2020 census, the population was 6,379. Its county seat is Bottineau.

The Territorial legislature identified Bottineau as one of the original counties of the territory. on January 4, 1873. Its organization was effected on July 17, 1884. It is named for Pierre Bottineau (c.1814-1895), a Métis pioneer, hunter, and trapper who became a successful land speculator.

Bottineau is well known for its winter park, snowmobiling, and ice fishing. It is south of the Canadian borders of Manitoba and Saskatchewan.

Geography

Bottineau County lies on the north side of North Dakota. Its north boundary line abuts the south boundary line of Canada. The Deep River flows south-southeastward through the center part of the county. The county terrain consists of rolling hills, dotted with lakes and ponds. The terrain slopes to the south, with its highest point on its upper east boundary line, at 2,283' (696m) ASL.

Part of the Turtle Mountain plateau lies in the northeastern corner of the county.

Adjacent counties and rural municipalities

 Argyle No. 1, Saskatchewan - north
 Municipality of Two Borders, Manitoba - north
 Municipality of Brenda-Waskada, Manitoba - north
 Municipality of Deloraine-Winchester, Manitoba - north
 Municipality of Boissevain-Morton, Manitoba - north
 Rolette County - east
 Pierce County - southeast
 McHenry County - south
 Renville County - west

Major highways

  U.S. Highway 83
  North Dakota Highway 5
  North Dakota Highway 14
  North Dakota Highway 43
  North Dakota Highway 60
  North Dakota Highway 256

Protected areas

 J. Clark Salyer National Wildlife Refuge (part)
 Lake Metigoshe State Park
 Lords Lake National Wildlife Refuge (part)
 North Dakota State Forest Service Land

Lakes

 Black Lake
 Boundary Lake
 Grass Lake
 Island Lake
 Long Lake
 Loon Lake
 Lords Lake
 Lake Metigoshe
 Pelican Lake
 Strawberry Lake

Demographics

2000 census
As of the 2000 census, there were 7,149 people, 2,962 households, and 1,954 families in the county. The population density was 4 people per square mile (2/km2). There were 4,409 housing units at an average density of 3 per square mile (1/km2). The racial makeup of the county was 97.22% White, 0.22% Black or African American, 1.45% Native American, 0.18% Asian, 0.01% Pacific Islander, 0.11% from other races, and 0.80% from two or more races. 0.49% of the population were Hispanic or Latino of any race. 44.4% were of Norwegian, 25.2% German and 5.4% French ancestry.

There were 2,962 households, out of which 27.30% had children under the age of 18 living with them, 58.70% were married couples living together, 4.30% had a female householder with no husband present, and 34.00% were non-families. 31.50% of all households were made up of individuals, and 16.40% had someone living alone who was 65 years of age or older.  The average household size was 2.30 and the average family size was 2.90.

The county population contained 22.20% under the age of 18, 8.00% from 18 to 24, 22.30% from 25 to 44, 26.20% from 45 to 64, and 21.30% who were 65 years of age or older. The median age was 43 years. For every 100 females there were 101.40 males. For every 100 females age 18 and over, there were 99.20 males.

The median income for a household in the county was $29,853, and the median income for a family was $37,701. Males had a median income of $26,728 versus $18,948 for females. The per capita income for the county was $16,227. About 7.50% of families and 10.70% of the population were below the poverty line, including 11.70% of those under age 18 and 11.10% of those age 65 or over.

2010 census
As of the 2010 census, there were 6,429 people, 2,832 households, and 1,823 families in the county. The racial makeup of the county was 95.1% white, 2.1% American Indian, 0.4% black or African American, 0.2% Asian, 0.3% from other races, and 1.8% from two or more races. Those of Hispanic or Latino origin made up 1.3% of the population. In terms of ancestry, 47.0% were Norwegian, 37.4% were German, 7.7% were Irish, 6.2% were Swedish, and 1.4% were American.

Of the 2,832 households, 22.8% had children under the age of 18 living with them, 55.3% were married couples living together, 5.6% had a female householder with no husband present, 35.6% were non-families, and 32.2% of all households were made up of individuals. The average household size was 2.17 and the average family size was 2.72. The median age was 48.0 years.

The median income for a household in the county was $40,227 and the median income for a family was $60,714. Males had a median income of $42,227 versus $27,500 for females. The per capita income for the county was $26,277. About 9.5% of families and 13.6% of the population were below the poverty line, including 16.5% of those under age 18 and 13.4% of those age 65 or over.

Communities

Cities

 Antler
 Bottineau (county seat)
 Gardena
 Kramer
 Landa
 Lansford
 Maxbass
 Newburg
 Overly
 Souris
 Westhope
 Willow City

Unincorporated communities

 Belmar
 Carbury
 Dunning
 Eckman
 Forfar
 Hurd
 Kuroki
 Omemee
 Renville
 Roth
 Russell
 Truro
 White Spur

Townships

 Amity
 Antler
 Bentinck
 Blaine
 Brander
 Cecil
 Chatfield
 Cordelia
 Cut Bank
 Dalen
 Eidsvold
 Elms
 Elysian
 Haram
 Hastings
 Hoffman
 Homen
 Kane
 Lansford
 Lewis
 Lordsburg
 Mount Rose
 Newborg
 Oak Creek
 Oak Valley
 Ostby
 Peabody
 Pickering
 Renville
 Richburg
 Roland
 Scandia
 Scotia
 Sergius
 Sherman
 Starbuck
 Stone Creek
 Tacoma
 Wayne
 Wellington
 Wheaton
 Whitby
 Whitteron
 Willow Vale

Politics
Bottineau County voters have been reliably Republican for decades. In no national election since 1964 has the county selected the Democratic Party candidate.

See also
 National Register of Historic Places listings in Bottineau County, North Dakota

References

External links
 Bottineau County diamond jubilee, 1884-1959 : Bottineau, North Dakota, June 28-29-30-July 1, 1959 from the Digital Horizons website
 Bottineau County opportunities : North Dakota - the sunshine state (1916) from the Digital Horizons website
 Bottineau County maps, Sheet 1 (eastern) and Sheet 2 (western), North Dakota DOT

 
1884 establishments in Dakota Territory